William Howard may refer to:

People

France
 William Howard (basketball) (born 1993), French basketball player

Kingdom of England

 William Howard (judge) (died 1308), English nobleman and ancestor of the aristocratic Howard family, Judge Advocate of the Fleet
 William Howard, 1st Baron Howard of Effingham (c. 1510–1573), English nobleman
 William Howard (died 1600) (1538–1600), English member of parliament
 William Howard (died 1672) (c. 1599–1672), English gentleman and member of parliament
 Lord William Howard (1563–1640), nicknamed "Belted Will" or "Bauld Willie", third son of the 4th Duke of Norfolk
 William Howard, 3rd Baron Howard of Effingham (1577–1615), his grandson, heir to the 1st Earl of Nottingham
 William Howard, 1st Viscount Stafford (1614–1680)
 William Howard, 3rd Baron Howard of Escrick (1626–1694), a conspirator in the Rye House Plot
 William Howard (died 1701) (c. 1674–1701), English Member of Parliament for Carlisle 1695–1701 and Northumberland 1701

Great Britain and United Kingdom
 William Howard, Viscount Andover (1714–1756), British Member of Parliament and heir to the Earl of Berkshire
 William Howard, 3rd Earl of Wicklow (1761–1818), British nobleman, Earl of Wicklow
 William Howard (1781–1843), British Member of Parliament for Morpeth 1806–1826 and 1830–1832, Sutherland 1837–1840
 William Howard, 4th Earl of Wicklow (1788–1869), British nobleman
 William Howard, 8th Earl of Wicklow (1902–1978), British nobleman
 William George Howard, 8th Earl of Carlisle (1808–1889), English clergyman and peer
 William Howard (typefounder), 19th-century designer who cast type at his foundry in Great Queen Street, Chiswick Press

Ireland
 William Howard (Irish politician) (died 1728), Irish Member of Parliament for Dublin City 1727–28

United States
 William Howard (engineer) (1793–1834), American mechanical engineer who was one of the first to work for the Baltimore and Ohio Railroad
 William Howard (congressman) (1817–1891), U.S. Representative from Ohio
 William Alanson Howard (1813–1880), U.S. Representative from Michigan (1855–1859) and Governor of Dakota Territory 1878–1880
 William Alvin Howard (born 1926), proof theorist after whom the Curry-Howard correspondence is named
 William Marcellus Howard (1857–1932), U.S. Representative from Georgia
 William S. Howard (1875–1953), U.S. Representative from Georgia
 William J. Howard (1799–1863), U.S. politician
 William K. Howard (1899–1954), American film director, writer and producer
 William Howard (American football) (born 1964), American football player
 M. William Howard Jr. (born 1946), American Christian minister
 William Howard (artist), American woodworker and craftsman
 William Lorenzo Howard (1921–2004), mayor of Monroe, Louisiana
 William Lee Howard (1860–1918), American physician and writer
 William R. Howard (1922-2009), American businessman and airline executive.

Other
 William Howard School, Brampton, England

See also